Shack Out on 101 is a 1955 American film noir crime film directed by Edward Dein and starring Terry Moore, Frank Lovejoy, Keenan Wynn and Lee Marvin.

Plot
Slob (Marvin), the lecherous short-order cook at the seaside greasy-spoon diner of sarcastic war veteran George (Wynn), lusts after sexy waitress Kotty (Moore). Also interested in Kotty is a scientist (Lovejoy), who spends the better part of his free time at the diner's counter. He works down the highway at a top-secret military base.  As it turns out, Slob is not just a short-order cook but also a spy using the diner as a home base for smuggling nuclear secrets out of the country through a connection with one of the diner's regulars.

Cast
 Terry Moore as Kotty
 Frank Lovejoy as Prof. Sam Bastion
 Keenan Wynn as George
 Lee Marvin as Slob / Mr. Gregory
 Whit Bissell as Eddie
 Jess Barker as Artie
 Donald Murphy as Pepe
 Frank DeKova as Prof. Claude Dillon
 Len Lesser as Perch
 Fred Gabourie as Lookout

See also
List of American films of 1955

References

External links
 
 
 

1955 films
1955 crime drama films
American anti-communist propaganda films
American crime drama films
American black-and-white films
American spy films
Cold War films
Cold War spy films
Film noir
Allied Artists films
Films scored by Paul Dunlap
1950s English-language films
Films directed by Edward Dein
1950s American films